The Chicago Network (TCN) is an American organization for professional women in the Chicago metropolitan area.

Founded in 1979, TCN includes professionals in business, the arts, government, nonprofits and academia.

Each year, TCN publishes The Chicago Network Census to document the progress of women business leaders in Chicago's 50 largest public companies. As of November 2020, TCN has approximately 500 members.

External links
 

 The Chicago Network Census

Organizations based in Chicago